This is a partial list of notable Ingush people.

Politics and military
 Sultan-Murza - prince of village Lars
 Muhammed from Ingushetia - mufti of Ichkeria and naib of Aukh
 Utsig Malsag - commander of the Russian Empire
 Yaponts Abadiyev – commander of several Red Army cavalry regiments during World War II
 Rashid-bek Akhriev – first North Caucasian pilot
 Bashir Aushev – Deputy Prime Minister of Ingushetia from 2002 to 2008
 Maksharip Aushev – opposition leader
 Ruslan Aushev – lieutenant-general in the Red Army, Hero of the Soviet Union, negotiator during the Beslan school hostage crisis, and first President of Ingushetia
 Sulumbek of Sagopshi – Ingush abrek
 Mandre Nalgiev - Ingush sniper and avenger
 Akhmed Khuchbarov – Ingush abrek
 Laysat Baysarova – Komsomol-educated Voroshilov shooter turned abrek
 Khizir Khadziev – Ingush abrek
 Issa Kostoyev – prosecutor
 Shirvani Kostoyev – Il-2 pilot during World War II; Hero of the Russian Federation
 Ahmed Malsagov – Pe-2 pilot during World War II; Hero of the Russian Federation
 Sulom-Bek Oskanov – Major General of the Air Force, Hero of the Russian Federation
 Murad Ozdoev – World War II fighter pilot, concentration camp survivor; Hero of the Russian Federation 
 Asiyat Tutaeva – Army medic during World War II
 Yunus-bek Yevkurov – Major-general, Hero of the Russian Federation, third president of Ingushetia
 Magomed Yevloyev – journalist and critic of Murat Zyazikov
 Murat Zyazikov – Second president of Ingushetia
 Ali Taziev – Ingush warlord, Commander of the Caucasian Front
 Ruslan Khuchbarov – Ingush warlord
 Magomed Khashiev – Ingush warlord

Athletes
 Israil Arsamakov – weightlifter and olympic champion
 Rakhim Chakhkiev – boxer
 Bekkhan Ozdoev – wrestler
 Islam Timurziev – boxer
 Magomed Ozdoyev - Soccer player in the Russian Premier League 
 Musa Evloev, Greco-Roman wrestler,  two-time world champion and two-time national champion
 Zelimkhan Bakayev, right winger for FC Spartak Moscow.

Business
Mikhail Gutseriyev – one of Russia's richest people with an estimated net worth of US$6.4 billion
 Said Gutsiriev – son of Mikhail Gutseriyev and CEO of ForteInvest
 Musa Keligov – former vice president of Lukoil
 Mikail Shishkhanov – banker and financier

Artists

 Ruslan Mamilow – sculptor

Lists of people by ethnicity